Santa Barbara National Forest was established as the Santa Barbara Forest Reserve by the General Land Office in California on December 22, 1903 with  by consolidation of Pine Mountain and Zaka Lake and Santa Ynez Forest Reserves. It included areas of the San Rafael Mountains and Santa Ynez Mountains.

U.S. National Forest
After the transfer of federal forests to the U.S. Forest Service in 1905, it became a U.S. National Forest on March 4, 1907. On July 1, 1910, San Luis National Forest was added. On August 18, 1919 Monterey National Forest was added. On December 3, 1936 the name was changed to Los Padres National Forest.

References

External links
 Forest History Society
 Listing of the National Forests of the United States and Their Dates (from Forest History Society website) Text from Davis, Richard C., ed. Encyclopedia of American Forest and Conservation History. New York: Macmillan Publishing Company for the Forest History Society, 1983. Vol. II, pp. 743-788.

Former National Forests of California
Los Padres National Forest
Protected areas of Santa Barbara County, California
San Rafael Mountains
Santa Ynez Mountains
Protected areas established in 1907
1907 establishments in California
1936 disestablishments in California
Protected areas disestablished in the 1930s